Yu Bin or Yu Pin may refer to:

Paul Yu Pin (1901–1978), Cardinal and Archbishop of Nanking
Yu Bin (painter) (born 1966), Chinese painter
Yu Bin (Go player) (born 1967), Chinese go player
Yu Bin (footballer) (born 1995), Chinese footballer
Bin Yu or Yu Bin, Chinese-American statistician